Nikos Pantidos (born 19 April 1991) is a Greek professional footballer who plays as a defender.

Career

Pantidos started playing football at Ethnikos academy in Pallini. In 2004, he joined Panathinaikos FC football academy and became an important member of their youth team which lead the club's officials to offer him his first professional contract.  On 30 January 2008, Pantidos signed a three-year deal with the Panathinaikos A-team. In 2013 he joined Panionios G.S.S., and in 2014 he became their captain. On 6 August 2016, after six months with the Slovakian club Dukla Banská Bystrica, Pantidos signed a year contract with Cypriot club Aris Limassol for an undisclosed fee.

He has represented Greece U17.

References

External links 
 Fair Play youth academy 

1991 births
Living people
Greek expatriate footballers
Greece youth international footballers
Association football defenders
Panathinaikos F.C. players
Ilisiakos F.C. players
Egaleo F.C. players
Ethnikos Asteras F.C. players
Aris Thessaloniki F.C. players
Panionios F.C. players
Super League Greece players
FK Dukla Banská Bystrica players
2. Liga (Slovakia) players
Expatriate footballers in Slovakia
Greek expatriate sportspeople in Slovakia
Footballers from Athens
Greek footballers